Peking University Resources (Holdings) Co., Ltd. known also as PKU Resources is a Chinese listed company. The company was incorporated in Bermuda and listed in the Hong Kong Stock Exchange. The company is an indirect non-wholly-owned subsidiary of Peking University, which in turn under the administration of the Ministry of Education. The company is broadly considered a state-owned enterprise of China. For the same reason, PKU Resources is a red chip company.

The Hong Kong headquarters of the company was located on Room 1408, 14/F of Wharf Cable Tower, Tsuen Wan; the parent company of PKU Resources: PKU Resources Group Holdings and PKU Resources Group were headquartered in Beijing.

The company had less than 20% free-floating shares if excluding the shares held by "Ronghai No. 10 SNIA QDII", a private equity fund managed by Rongtong Fund Management, as well as the shares held by a consortium of the executive director Zheng Fu Shuang. The company was not included in any stock market indice, thus it is not eligible to Shenzhen-Hong Kong Stock Connect nor Shanghai-Hong Kong Stock Connect.

Name
Despite Peking University Resources (Holdings) was commonly known as Peking University Resources, in mainland China, there were more famous Peking University Resources Group, found in 1992, and its subsidiary Peking University Resources Group Holdings, which were the parent companies of Hong Kong-based listed company.

History
The company was registered (as a foreign company) in Hong Kong on 10 September 1991 as Management Investment & Technology (Holdings).

In 2013, the company acquired some real estate business from intermediate parent company Founder Group and renamed into Peking University Resources (Holdings). The listed company also issued 326,792,000 number of new shares to independent third parties for HK$0.80 each in December 2013. After the deal Founder Group and Zheng Fu Shuang still owned a combined 63.74% shares.

In 2014, Peking University Resources acquired 12 projects from another intermediate parent company Peking University Resources Group Holdings in cash and shares deal (the shares was allocated to intermediate holding company Founder Information). In December 2014 new shares were issued to Zheng Fu Shuang and other shareholders for HK$0.65 each.

Shareholders
As at 31 December 2016, the direct major shareholder (for 65.96%) of the listed company was HK incorporated "Founder Information (Hong Kong) Limited", which were owned by PKU Resources Group Holdings (51%), Founder Group (46.36%) and Founder Commodities (2.64%) (as of May 2016), all non-wholly owned subsidiary of the Peking University.

The second largest shareholder was Zheng Fu Shuang which he held 200,019,000 shares directly, and an additional 584,984,000 shares held by BVI-incorporated company Starry Nation Limited, which another BVI company, Shine Crest Group was the shareholder of Starry Nation; Zheng, owned 95% shares of Shine Crest Group. 100 million shares held by Starry Nation Limited were charged to Founder Information (HK). Zheng Fu Shuang was an executive director since September 2006. At first he owned all his stake (240,425,000 number of shares or 21.85%) via a British Virgin Islands incorporated company Shining Wisdom Group. The stake were acquired from the intermediate company of EC-Founder for HK$6.85 million (HK$0.285 per share).

The third largest shareholder was "Rongtong Ronghai No. 10 SNIA QDII", a private equity fund based in mainland China, and managed by Rongtong Fund Management. The unit holders of the fund were not disclosed.

Footnotes

References

External links
  
 Official website of Peking University Resources Group 

Companies listed on the Hong Kong Stock Exchange
Real estate companies of China
Tsuen Wan
Peking University
Government-owned companies of China
Chinese companies established in 2000
Conglomerate companies of China
Privatization in China
Offshore companies of Bermuda